Fairview is a township in Barkly East, a rural town in Eastern Cape Province, South Africa.

References

Populated places in the Senqu Local Municipality